The Workington Comets are a British speedway club, based in Workington, Cumbria, racing out of the Northside Speedway Track. The team previously operated from 1970 to 2018 and were based at Derwent Park Stadium which they shared with Workington Town Rugby League Football Club. They were closed at the end of the 2018 SGB Championship season, but re-opened in 2022 and will compete in the 2023 National Development League speedway season.

History

1970–1987
The team's inaugural league season was the 1970 British League Division Two season in which they finished in 11th place. The team spent 12 years in Division 2, finishing 2nd in 1973 and 3rd in 1976.

The 1987 season saw Glasgow Tigers based at Derwent Park. However the team changed its name to Workington Tigers soon afterwards but held their last fixture against Stoke on 31 July. The team's results were expunged. It was the last season of speedway at Workington for 12 years.

1999–2018
Speedway returned in 1999 as Workington joined the Premier League (division 2). They would spend 20 consecutive years in the division but before their 2018 play off victory their best finish was 2nd in 2004.

At the end of the 2007 season, the club was sold by promoter Tony Mole to businessman Keith Denham. Several riders left for the Birmingham Brummies but Carl Stonehewer and Kauko Nieminen stayed. The club went on to win the Young Shield, Premier League Pairs and Premier League Four-Team Championship during the 2008 season. The Premier League Fours was an event that they had won on three previous occasions, in 2001, 2004 and 2006.

In October 2018, the Comets won the SGB Championship for the first time in their history. In the same month, the Comets made it a treble win with Knockout Cup and Championship Shield victories.

In January 2019, the Comets announced their withdrawal from the SGB Championship and from racing in the 2019 season.

2022-present
The return of speedway to Workington was announced, with the previous Northside training track in the town being redeveloped for league racing. The side, under the control of local businessman Andrew Bain, were set to enter the 2022 National League but a series of vandalism incidents at the circuit pushed this back a year. Having received permission to use the 'Comets' nickname, the club returned to action for the 2023 National Development League speedway season.

Notable riders
The club's most notable rider was Carl Stonehewer, who still holds the record for the most Comets appearances and remains the only Premier League rider to qualify for the Speedway Grand Prix series.

René Bach
Kauko Nieminen
Adam Roynon
Simon Stead
Carl Stonehewer
Brent Werner
James Wright

Season summary

Honours
SGB Championship
Winners: 2018

SGB Championship Knockout Cup
Winners: 2018

SGB Championship Shield
Winners: 2018

Young Shield
Winners: 2008, 2009, 2010

Premier League Four-Team Championship
Winners: 2001, 2004, 2006, 2008, 2009

Premier League Riders Championship
2000 Carl Stonehewer
2001 Carl Stonehewer
2007 James Wright

Premier League Pairs Championship
1999 Carl Stonehewer with Brent Werner
2000 Carl Stonehewer with Mick Powell
2001 Carl Stonehewer with Peter I. Karlsson
2003 Carl Stonehewer with Simon Stead
2008 Kauko Nieminen with Daniel Nermark
2012 René Bach with Adam Roynon

References

Speedway Premier League teams
SGB Championship teams
Sport in Cumbria
Workington